Englishtown may refer to:

Englishtown, New Jersey
Englishtown, Nova Scotia

See also
Englishtown Formation, Delaware, United States